Day Mountain is a summit in West Virginia, in the United States.

Day Mountain was named after Charles Day, according to local history.

References

Mountains of Pocahontas County, West Virginia
Mountains of West Virginia